Malvern Hall is a historic apartment building located in the Mount Airy neighborhood of Philadelphia, Pennsylvania. It is located next to McCallum Manor. It was built in 1925, and is a four-story, "H"-shaped, steel framed building faced in brick and stone. Also on the property is a contributing garage unit. It is currently managed by Benjamin Cobrin & Company, a community association management firm.

It was added to the National Register of Historic Places in 1983.

References

Residential buildings on the National Register of Historic Places in Philadelphia
Residential buildings completed in 1925
Mount Airy, Philadelphia